Shantinagar may refer to:
Shantinagar, Mechi, Nepal
Shantinagar, Rapti, Nepal
Shantinagar, Dhaka, Bangladesh
Shantinagar Bus Station, Bangalore